Streptomyces curacoi is an actinobacterium species in the genus Streptomyces.

References 

curacoi
Bacteria described in 1963